The 1990 World Sambo Championships were sambo competitions held in Moscow, Soviet Union, in 1990. The championships were organized by FIAS.

Medal overview

External links 
Results on Sambo.net.ua

World Sambo Championships
1990 in sambo (martial art)
Martial arts in the Soviet Union